Koreana Hotel is a skyscraper and hotel on Taepyeongno, in Jung-gu, Seoul, South Korea. The hotel, with a marble lobby, contains 344 rooms and is 14 stories high.

Construction
Construction began on the hotel on 20 December 1969 and it was completed exactly two years later in 1971. On 11 April 1989 it received 4-star status by Tourist Hotel Classification. 9 rooms were added in October 1998 and another 9 in April 2004. In 2001 renovation was completed of its exterior to a sleek looking modern hotel. It contains a number of restaurants, including Sunrise, Danube, Saka-e (catering in Japanese cuisine), Great Shanghai, The Blue, Mr. Chow and Peltierone. The Rough Guide to Seoul describes it as "half the price of some of its competitors, but with similar rooms and service standards".

References

External links

Koreana Hotel Official Website
Seoul Gyeonggi Room Information

Hotels in Seoul
Skyscrapers in Seoul
Hotels established in 1971
Hotel buildings completed in 1971
1971 establishments in South Korea
Skyscraper hotels in South Korea
Buildings and structures in Jung District, Seoul
20th-century architecture in South Korea